"Fake It" is a song by South African rock band Seether. It is the first single from the band's album Finding Beauty in Negative Spaces. The single quickly rose to number one on both the Billboard Hot Mainstream Rock Tracks and Hot Modern Rock Tracks charts. It also reached number 56 on the Billboard Hot 100, the second highest of their singles after "Broken", which reached number 20. The single was certified platinum by the RIAA.

The original version of the song was first recorded in singer Shaun Morgan's bedroom and was an iTunes exclusive bonus track named "Quirk," included with pre-orders of Finding Beauty in Negative Spaces.

Music video
The music video, which was directed by Tony Petrossian, debuted on Seether's website as part of a "worldwide fan premiere" on October 23, 2007, the same day the album was released. It shows Shaun Morgan filming a music video on a plane set, with women dancing seductively around him. It then goes on to show the band playing in a snowy clearing and an industrial looking arena surrounded by fans. Each setting is then inundated with various parts of the others, such as having the scantily clad models from the plane dance through the snowy clearing, revealing all the various music video tropes to be faked in some way, through the use of props, bluescreen, or computer manipulation, reflecting the theme of the lyrics.

Usage in media
"Fake It" was announced to be the official theme song of the 2008 WWE No Way Out pay-per-view event that took place on February 17, 2008 in Las Vegas, Nevada. It also appears on the soundtrack in the video game Burnout Paradise. On June 8, 2010, it was released in the Rock Band Network for Rock Band 2, but was later released as official Rock Band 4 DLC on July 19, 2018. It was also featured as Rocksmith 2014 DLC on February 10, 2015 in the Seether song pack.

Personnel
Shaun Morgan – lead vocals, guitar
Dale Stewart – bass, backing vocals
John Humphrey – drums, percussion

Charts
The song held the number one spot for 14 weeks on the U.S. Billboard Hot Mainstream Rock Tracks chart. It also spent eight weeks atop the Billboard Hot Modern Rock Tracks chart.

Certifications

Achievements
"Fake It" was featured in the Burnout Paradise game as one of the in-game soundtracks where it was ranked tenth on ProGamists list of "Top 10 songs featured in racing games".

References

2007 singles
2007 songs
Seether songs
Wind-up Records singles
Music videos directed by Tony Petrossian
Song recordings produced by Howard Benson
Songs written by Shaun Morgan
Songs written by John Humphrey (drummer)
Songs written by Dale Stewart